Matepatepa is a village in Bindura District province in Zimbabwe.

Populated places in Zimbabwe